Advania ehf is a Nordic information technology service corporation headquartered in Reykjavík, Iceland. The company is the largest in its field in Iceland and the 9th largest in the Nordic countries.

Pre-Advania
Advania is the result of numerous mergers and acquisitions of mainly Icelandic companies, but also of some European companies. Its roots go as far back as 1939, when EJS was founded and 1952, when Skýrr was founded.

Mergers

Acquisitions

References

Advania
Advania